Cinchona calisaya is a species of shrub or tree in the family Rubiaceae.

References

Further reading

calisaya
Flora of the Andes
Flora of the Amazon
Flora of Bolivia
Flora of Colombia
Trees of the Amazon
Trees of Peru
Medicinal plants of South America
Quinine